John Ellis Adams (May 5, 1920 – August 21, 1996) was a Canadian ice hockey left winger who played one season in the National Hockey League with the Montreal Canadiens, in 1940–41. The rest of his career, which lasted from 1938 to 1949, was spent in various minor leagues. He was born in Calgary, Alberta. He died on August 21, 1996 in Surrey, British Columbia.

Playing career
Jack Adams played 42 regular season games and three playoff games for the Montreal Canadiens in the 1940–41 NHL season. During the regular season, he scored 6 goals and 18 points; during the playoffs, he was held pointless.

He also played for several Canadian minor league hockey teams, both before and after his NHL stint.

In 1941, he was married to Valerie Rowan of Vancouver, British Columbia. He died in 1996 in Surrey, British Columbia. His wife, Valerie died in 2009.

Career statistics

Regular season and playoffs

References

External links
 

1920 births
1996 deaths
Buffalo Bisons (AHL) players
Canadian ice hockey left wingers
Houston Skippers players
Montreal Canadiens players
Montreal Royals (QSHL) players
New Westminster Royals (WHL) players
Ice hockey people from Calgary
Vancouver Lions players
Canadian expatriate ice hockey players in the United States